Souneat Ouphaphone (born 10 April 1958) is a Laotian boxer. He competed in the men's bantamweight event at the 1980 Summer Olympics.

References

External links
 

1958 births
Living people
Laotian male boxers
Olympic boxers of Laos
Boxers at the 1980 Summer Olympics
Place of birth missing (living people)
Bantamweight boxers